"Sugar Bush" is a popular song, composed by Fred Michel (born in 1898) in 1930. It was translated into English by Josef Marais. Michel sold the rights to Polliacks for a small sum of money.

A version recorded as a duet by Doris Day and Frankie Laine was the best-known recording, and appeared on the first UK Singles Chart in November 1952, peaking at number 8 in a total chart run of eight weeks. A version by Eve Boswell, was also recorded in the United Kingdom.

The song is based on a traditional South-African song, "Suikerbossie" ("Sugar Bush" in Afrikaans).

References

Frankie Laine songs
Doris Day songs
Male–female vocal duets
1930 songs